The Minister of Consumer and Corporate Affairs was a Government of Canada cabinet position held between 1967 and 1995. The minister was responsible for consumer and corporate issues relating to legislation at the federal level.

The minister was also the Registrar General of Canada.

Ministers

The position of Minister of Consumer and Corporate Affairs was abolished and its duties inherited by the new position of Minister of Industry (list) on March 29, 1995.

Consumer and Corporate Affairs